Quinn Patrick Mulhern (born September 20, 1984) is a retired American professional mixed martial artist who most recently competed in the Welterweight division of the Ultimate Fighting Championship. A professional competitor from 2007 until 2014, Mulhern also competed for Strikeforce, King of the Cage, and is the former King of the Cage Welterweight Champion.

Background
Mulhern is from Santa Cruz, California and graduated from Harbor High School. Mulhern was introduced to mixed martial arts when he began training in Brazilian jiu-jitsu as a teenager.

Mixed martial arts career

Early career
In 2007, Mulhern made his professional debut at a Gladiator Challenge event. He fought and defeated Randy Blackwell midway through the first round via submission. His next two fights were both under the King of the Cage banner, both fight were wins for Mulhern, one submission and one close split decision.

After earning a record of 7-0, Mulhern took on the much more experienced, Chris Brennan. Mulhern dominated the fight and won via first round submission using the rare omoplata maneuver. The win earned him a title fight against current UFC fighter, Mike Guymon. The fight was back and forth but late in the fourth round, Guymon defeated Mulhern via TKO, retaining his title.

Mulhern bounced back from his loss to Guymon by defeating Ultimate Fighting Championship veteran Rich Clementi at King of the Cage: Vengeance on February 12, 2010.  This bout was a part of King of the Cage's debut on HDNet.

Mulhern captured the King of the Cage Welterweight Championship on March 26, 2010 by defeating Koffi Adzitso at King of the Cage: Legacy. He most recently defeated Joey Gorczynski at King of the Cage: Honor.

Mulhern defended his title for the first time against Levi Stout, defeating Stout via first-round submission.

On December 4, 2010, Mulhern defeated the Canadian King of the Cage Welterweight Champion Garret Davis in a unanimous decision at King of the Cage: Black Ops. This event unified the Canadian King of the Cage and World King of the Cage Welterweight Championships.

Strikeforce
On May 6, 2011, it was announced that Mulhern had signed a multi-fight deal with Strikeforce.  He made his debut at Strikeforce Challengers: Fodor vs. Terry and lost to Jason High via unanimous decision.

Mulhern remained busy with the promotion, having won his next two bouts in Strikeforce on their Challengers series in September and November 2011.  He returned in May 2012 as he faced Yuri Villefort at Strikeforce: Barnett vs. Cormier and won the fight via split decision.

For his fifth Strikeforce fight, Mulhern was expected to face Jorge Santiago on September 29, 2012 at Strikeforce: Melendez vs. Healy. However, after the event was cancelled the bout was scrapped.

Ultimate Fighting Championship
Mulhern made his UFC debut in March 2013 as he faced Rick Story on March 16, 2013 at UFC 158, replacing an injured Sean Pierson. He lost the fight via TKO in the first round.

Mulhern was expected to face Ryan Couture in a lightweight bout on August 31, 2013 at UFC 164.  However, Mulhern pulled out of the fight citing a hand injury and was replaced by Al Iaquinta.

Mulhern was expected to face Thiago Tavares on November 9, 2013 at UFC Fight Night 32.  However, Mulhern pulled out of the bout citing another injury and was replaced by Justin Salas.

Mulhern faced Katsunori Kikuno on January 4, 2014 at UFC Fight Night 34. He lost the fight via unanimous decision and later announced his retirement from MMA.

Personal life
Mulhern attended St. John's College, graduating in 2008 from their campus in Santa Fe, New Mexico with a degree in liberal arts.

Mixed martial arts record

|-
| Loss
| align=center| 18–4
| Katsunori Kikuno
| Decision (unanimous)
| UFC Fight Night: Saffiedine vs. Lim
| 
| align=center| 3
| align=center| 5:00
| Marina Bay, Singapore
| 
|-
| Loss
| align=center| 18–3
| Rick Story
| TKO (punches)
| UFC 158
| 
| align=center| 1
| align=center| 3:05
| Montreal, Quebec, Canada
| 
|-
| Win
| align=center| 18–2
| Yuri Villefort
| Decision (split)
| Strikeforce: Barnett vs. Cormier
| 
| align=center| 3 
| align=center| 5:00
| San Jose, California, United States
| 
|-
| Win
| align=center| 17–2
| David Hulett
| Decision (unanimous)
| Strikeforce Challengers: Britt vs. Sayers
| 
| align=center| 3 
| align=center| 5:00
| Las Vegas, Nevada, United States
| 
|-
| Win
| align=center| 16–2
| Danny Davis
| Submission (arm-triangle choke)
| Strikeforce Challengers: Larkin vs. Rossborough
| 
| align=center| 3 
| align=center| 4:08 
| Las Vegas, Nevada, United States
| 
|-
| Loss
| align=center| 15–2
| Jason High
| Decision (unanimous)
| Strikeforce Challengers: Fodor vs. Terry
| 
| align=center| 3
| align=center| 5:00
| Kent, Washington, United States
| 
|-
| Win
| align=center| 15–1
| Anselmo Martinez
| Submission (rear-naked choke)
| KOTC: Texas
| 
| align=center| 1
| align=center| 4:48
| Lubbock, Texas, United States
| 
|-
| Win
| align=center| 14–1
| Garett Davis
| Decision (unanimous)
| KOTC: Black Ops
| 
| align=center| 5
| align=center| 5:00
| Cold Lake, Alberta, Canada
| 
|-
| Win
| align=center| 13–1
| Levi Stout
| Submission (rear-naked choke)
| KOTC: Imminent Danger
| 
| align=center| 1
| align=center| 2:52
| Mescalero, New Mexico, United States
| 
|-
| Win
| align=center| 12–1
| Joey Gorczynski
| Submission (rear-naked choke)
| KOTC: Honor
| 
| align=center| 3
| align=center| 0:53
| Mescalero, New Mexico, United States
| 
|-
| Win
| align=center| 11–1
| Koffi Adzitso
| Submission (rear-naked choke)
| KOTC: Legacy
| 
| align=center| 2
| align=center| 1:36
| Reno, Nevada, United States
| 
|-
| Win
| align=center| 10–1
| Boy Morgan
| TKO (punches)
| KOTC: Native Warriors
| 
| align=center| 1
| align=center| 1:10
| Santa Fe, New Mexico, United States
| 
|-
| Win
| align=center| 9–1
| Rich Clementi
| TKO (punches)
| KOTC: Vengeance
| 
| align=center| 2
| align=center| 3:09
| Mescalero, New Mexico, United States
| 
|-
| Loss
| align=center| 8–1
| Mike Guymon
| TKO (submission to punch)
| KOTC: Distorted
| 
| align=center| 4
| align=center| 4:32
| Highland, California, United States
| 
|-
| Win
| align=center| 8–0
| Chris Brennan
| Submission (omoplata)
| KOTC: Militia
| 
| align=center| 1
| align=center| 2:01
| Highland, California, United States
| 
|-
| Win
| align=center| 7–0
| Ricky Legere
| Submission (triangle choke)
| KOTC: New Breed
| 
| align=center| 2
| align=center| 2:52
| Mescalero, New Mexico, United States
| 
|-
| Win
| align=center| 6–0
| Manuel Otero
| Submission (rear-naked choke)
| KOTC: Goodfellas
| 
| align=center| 1
| align=center| 1:55
| Albuquerque, New Mexico, United States
| 
|-
| Win
| align=center| 5–0
| Brian Grimshaw
| TKO (punches)
| FW 16: International
| 
| align=center| 1
| align=center| 4:22
| Albuquerque, New Mexico, United States
| 
|-
| Win
| align=center| 4–0
| Blue Edwards
| Submission (triangle choke)
| Rage in the Cage 113
| 
| align=center| 2
| align=center| 0:34
| Albuquerque, New Mexico, United States
| 
|-
| Win
| align=center| 3–0
| Jeremy Ferguson
| Decision (split)
| KOTC: Badlands
| 
| align=center| 3
| align=center| 3:00
| Albuquerque, New Mexico, United States
| 
|-
| Win
| align=center| 2–0
| Doug Brown
| Submission (armbar)
| KOTC: Hierarchy
| 
| align=center| 1
| align=center| 1:42
| Albuquerque, New Mexico, United States
| 
|-
| Win
| align=center| 1–0
| Randy Blackwell
| Submission (kimura)
| GC 65: Global War
| 
| align=center| 1
| align=center| 3:44
| Farmington, New Mexico, United States
|

See also
 List of male mixed martial artists

References

External links
 
 

American male mixed martial artists
Mixed martial artists from California
Welterweight mixed martial artists
Mixed martial artists utilizing Brazilian jiu-jitsu
American practitioners of Brazilian jiu-jitsu
People awarded a black belt in Brazilian jiu-jitsu
Living people
1984 births
Sportspeople from Santa Cruz, California
Ultimate Fighting Championship male fighters